2022 Missouri legalization initiative (2022 Missouri Constitutional Amendment 3) was a voter initiative on the November 2022 ballot. It was approved by voters, legalizing cannabis in the U.S. state of Missouri.

Provisions
Under the proposed amendment to the Constitution of Missouri, adults may possess cannabis for any reason. A 6% state sales tax would be levied. Criminal records for nonviolent cannabis offenses for possessing three pounds or less would be allowed to be expunged. Judges can prevent an expungement for "good cause".

Missouri Department of Health and Senior Services is directed to conduct cannabis licensing and regulation.

Support and opposition 
There has been opposition to the scheme's licensing caps giving an advantage to existing medical dispensary license holders due to existing medical license holders being first in line for recreational licenses, raising questions about "fairness and equity". A competing bill without caps was introduced in the state legislature. It failed after it was amended with two provisions labeled "poison pills", including licensing caps. There has also been opposition due to there not being an automatic expungement of criminal records. 

Protect Our Kids PAC opposed the initiative. 

Endorsement came from Missouri ACLU in March, 2022.

History 
The measure was filed with the secretary of state for approval in August 2021, and was qualified for signature gathering on October 6, 2021. The sponsoring organization's campaign manager said on May 4, 2022 that they were "confident" that the number of signatures collected by that date, a few days before the deadline, "provides the necessary cushion to qualify for the ballot". On the May 8 deadline, twice the minimum number of signatures were submitted. On August 9, 2022, The Missouri Secretary of State, Jay Ashcroft, certified the initiative to appear as Amendment 3 on the November ballot.

In August 2022, on the last day of the 10-day challenge period following certification, the prohibitionist organization Protect Our Kids funded a lawsuit to remove the initiative from the November ballot. The lawsuit was dismissed on September 9. The Associated Press used the suit as an example of "pushback against the initiative process [that] is part of a several-year trend that gained steam as Democratic-aligned groups have increasingly used petitions to force public votes on issues that Republican-led legislatures have opposed". On September 13, the deadline for challenges, the state supreme court allowed the initiative to appear on the ballot by refusing to review a lower court's decision to reject an appeal.

The amendment was approved by voters on November 8, 2022 by a 53-47% margin. Despite initially saying that recreational sales would begin on March 6, 2023, the Missouri Department of Health and Senior Services unexpectedly announced on March 2 that licenses would be issued to recreational dispensaries the following day.

See also
Cannabis in Missouri
List of 2022 United States cannabis reform proposals
List of Missouri ballot measures

References

External links 
Petition 2022-059 information at Missouri Secretary of State, including full text of measure
 
Missouri Marijuana Legalization Initiative (2022) at Ballotpedia

2022 cannabis law reform
Cannabis in Missouri
Cannabis ballot measures in the United States
Initiatives in the United States
2022 Missouri elections
2022 ballot measures